Convention & Exhibition City station is a station on Line 20 of Shenzhen Metro in Shenzhen, Guangdong, China, which opened on 28 December 2021. It is located in Bao'an District.

Station layout

References

Railway stations in Guangdong
Shenzhen Metro stations
Bao'an District
Railway stations in China opened in 2021